Erora quaderna, the Arizona hairstreak, is a species of hairstreak in the butterfly family Lycaenidae. It is found in North America.

The MONA or Hodges number for Erora quaderna is 4350.

Subspecies
These two subspecies belong to the species Erora quaderna:
 Erora quaderna quaderna
 Erora quaderna sanfordi dos Passos, 1940

References

Further reading

External links

 

Eumaeini
Articles created by Qbugbot